= Dafydd ap Maredudd ab Ednyfed =

Dafydd ap Maredudd ab Ednyfed was a 15th-century Welsh poet. He may have written a cywydd in 1460 when Richard, Duke of York, returned from Ireland to start his new campaign against Henry VI, and hastily summoned Parliament later that year. It is often attributed to him, although elsewhere the same poem is attributed to Dafydd Llwyd ap Llywelyn ap Gruffudd or to Llywelyn ab Ednyfed alias Llywelyn ap Maredudd ab Ednyfed.
